Major-General Sir Robert Fanshawe, KCB, DSO (5 November 1863 – 24 August 1946) was a British Army officer, who commanded the 48th (South Midland) Division from 1915 to 1918 during the First World War. He was the youngest of three brothers (Edward, Hew, and Robert) who all rose to command divisions or corps during the war.

Fanshawe joined the Oxfordshire Light Infantry in 1883, and served with his regiment in India until the Second Boer War, where he commanded a mobile column and was mentioned in despatches. At the outbreak of the First World War he was on the staff of the British Expeditionary Force (BEF), and later commanded a regular brigade on the Western Front, before being promoted to divisional command in 1915. He commanded the 48th (South Midland) Division for three years, including service at the Somme, Ancre, Passchendale, and on the Italian Front, before being removed from command after his corps commander objected to his defensive strategy. He was relegated to commanding a second-line home service division, and retired from the army in 1918.

Early military career
Fanshawe was born in 1863, the youngest son of the Reverend Henry Leighton Fanshawe, of Chilworth, Oxfordshire. After attending Marlborough College, Fanshawe joined the 2nd Battalion of the newly formed Oxfordshire Light Infantry, the former 52nd (Oxfordshire) Regiment of Foot, in 1883. He spent the next sixteen years with the regiment, primarily on service in India, during which he was promoted to captain on 15 April 1892, and served in the Tirah Campaign of 1897–1898. He was the younger son of three brothers with significant military careers; Edward (b. 1859) joined the artillery and Hew (b. 1860) joined the cavalry, all three rising to command corps or divisions during the First World War.

He entered the Staff College, Camberley at the beginning of 1899, but following the outbreak of the Second Boer War, he was sent to South Africa that November, to serve on the Inspector-General's staff. He saw service at the Relief of Kimberley and the Battle of Paardeberg (February 1900), where he was wounded; later, in April 1900, he was made adjutant of the 6th Battalion Mounted Infantry, and on 2 September 1900 promoted to major. In 1901, he took command of a mobile column, which he commanded to the end of the war. He received the local rank of lieutenant colonel whilst holding this command, on 27 January 1902. For his service in South Africa, he was mentioned in despatches twice and awarded the Distinguished Service Order (DSO). Following the end of the war in June 1902, Fanshawe returned to the United Kingdom in the SS Dunottar Castle, which arrived at Southampton the following month.

In September 1902 he was posted to the staff of the 4th Division on Salisbury Plain as deputy assistant adjutant-general, after he received the brevet promotion to lieutenant colonel on 22 August 1902. He returned to his regiment in 1903. He commanded the 2nd Battalion from 1907 to 1911, when he was promoted colonel and posted as chief of staff (GSO.1) to the 1st Division.

First World War
At the outbreak of the First World War, Fanshawe's division was mobilised as part of the British Expeditionary Force (BEF) for service in France. On 20 September 1914, he was appointed an acting Brigadier-General to command the 6th Brigade, part of the 2nd Division.

He led the brigade through the First Battle of Ypres and the Battle of Festubert in early 1915, where it played a key part in the initial successful night attack. In mid-June, he was promoted to take over the 48th (South Midland) Division, a Territorial Force (TF) unit, after its previous General Officer Commanding (GOC), Major-General Henry Heath, fell ill. He commanded the division at the Battle of the Somme, the Battle of the Ancre, and the Battle of Passchendaele, then on the Italian Front from late 1917 onwards, including the Austrian offensives of June 1918.

Fanshawe spent a good deal of time visiting front-line units, where he "liked to drift into the trench in an old raincoat so that men were not intimidated" and would sometimes venture out with a single escort to patrol no-man's land. More unusually, he had a habit of giving his soldiers chocolates when he met them returning from the lines or on inspections. Such behaviour scandalised his staff officers, who were privately disapproving of Fanshawe's informality with his troops but it did not lead to the disapproval of his superiors; in September 1917, a confidential report by Ivor Maxse, his corps commander, had judged him to be "a good average divisional commander and trainer".

Fanshawe was strongly in favour of elastic defence, where a lightly garrisoned front line would delay an enemy attack, and then a strong counter-attack would recapture lost ground, and had been training 48th Division in this mould since he took command in 1915; the Italian theatre was the first opportunity to put this approach fully into practice. The 48th Division was attacked on 15 June 1918 by the Austrians at the Battle of the Piave River; in keeping with the plan, leading elements fell back and a counter-attack was organised, recapturing the lost ground and stalling the offensive entirely.

Whilst a success, this result was greeted with dismay by the corps commander, the Earl of Cavan; he was a believer in a more traditional strongly held static line of defence and felt that Fanshawe did not need to have given up any ground at all. Fanshawe was quickly relieved of his command and ordered home, leaving Italy four days after the end of the battle, on 20 June.

Francis Mackay wrote that it was the dismissal of a general who had a sound defensive plan applied by officers and men of high morale and confidence.
 The Italians, senior partners at Asiago, frequently sacked senior officers who had suffered setbacks in battle. Lord Cavan, who succeeded Herbert Plumer as GOC of the British Forces in Italy, may have played a political and unpleasant hand in dismissing Fanshawe. 
 Cavan thought that after his briefing of 14 June, Fanshawe should have reinforced the front line in the face of an expected Austrian attack.  Cavan had also failed to spot the weaknesses and did not change the battle disposition when he visited Fanshawe at his battle headquarters.
 As a commander, Fanshawe allowed his troops to suffer unnecessary casualties, which, in 1918, was a cause for dismissal.
 Despite preparations for a British attack, there was no British artillery support to stem the Austrian advance.

MacKay also reports that the Official History records that Fanshawe may have lost his grip on the battle on the morning of 15 June 1918.

Fanshawe was respected throughout the 48th Division. He trained his commanders to use their initiative in the Battle of the Woods and Clouds, where lines of sight and communications were very limited. Yet his Battle Narrative is inadequate, inaccurate and trite, but it sheds no light on his sacking. He left, uncomplainingly, gentlemanly to the end and did not see further active service. Many officers in the 48th Division complained for years about his dishonourable treatment.

He was appointed to command the 69th (2nd East Anglian) Division on home service in November 1918. Through the war, he was mentioned in despatches eight times, as well as knighted.

After the war
He retired from the army in August 1919; he later served as the honorary colonel of the 1st/7th Battalion, Worcestershire Regiment, a TF unit that formed part of the 48th Division. He died in 1946, aged eighty-three, after falling from his horse, and is buried near Oxford.

References

References
 "FANSHAWE, Maj.-Gen. Sir Robert", in 
 Obituary notice in The Times, 26 August 1946, p. 7
 
 
 
 

 

|-
 

1863 births
1946 deaths
British Army major generals
Burials in Oxfordshire
British Army generals of World War I
Companions of the Distinguished Service Order
Knights Commander of the Order of the Bath
British military personnel of the Tirah campaign
Oxfordshire and Buckinghamshire Light Infantry officers
British Army personnel of the Second Boer War